Novarupta is a volcano that was formed in 1912, located on the Alaska Peninsula on a slope of Trident Volcano in Katmai National Park and Preserve, about  southwest of Anchorage. Formed during the largest volcanic eruption of the 20th century, Novarupta released 30 times the volume of magma of the 1980 eruption of Mount St. Helens.

Eruption of 1912

The 1912 eruption that formed Novarupta was the largest to occur during the 20th century. It began on June 6, 1912, and culminated in a series of violent eruptions. Rated a 6 on the Volcanic Explosivity Index, the 60-hour-long eruption expelled  of ash, thirty times as much as the 1980 eruption of Mount St. Helens. During the 20th century, only the 1991 eruption of Mount Pinatubo in the Philippines and the 1902 eruption of Santa María in Guatemala were of comparable magnitude; Mount Pinatubo ejected  of tephra, and Santa María just slightly less.

At least two larger eruptions occurred in the Dutch East Indies (now Indonesia) during the 19th century: the 1815 eruption of Tambora ( of tephra) and the 1883 eruption of Krakatoa (
of tephra).

The eruption ended with the extrusion of a lava dome of rhyolite that plugged the vent.

Despite the magnitude of the eruption, no deaths directly resulted. Eyewitness accounts from people located downwind in the path of a thick ash cloud described the gradual lowering of visibility to next to nothing.  Ash threatened to contaminate drinking water and destroyed food resources, but the Alaska Natives were aided in their survival by traditional knowledge passed down through generations from previous eruptions.  However, the Native villages experiencing the heaviest ash falls were abandoned and the inhabitants relocated.

Valley of Ten Thousand Smokes

Pyroclastic flows from the eruption formed the Valley of Ten Thousand Smokes, named by botanist Robert F. Griggs, who explored the volcano's aftermath for the National Geographic Society in 1916.

The eruption that formed the Valley of Ten Thousand Smokes is one of the few in recorded history to have produced welded tuff, producing numerous fumaroles that persisted for 15 years.

Katmai National Park

See also

 List of volcanoes in the United States
 Timeline of volcanism on Earth
 Parícutin, a cinder cone volcano in Mexico whose emergence could be fully observed.

References

External links

 USGS collection of descriptions of Novarupta
 USGS QuickTime video clip on Novarupta (36 seconds/0.8 MB)
 geology.com, Novarupta – topographic maps, annotated satellite images
 Alaska Volcano Observatory: Novarupta
 USGS Photographic Library – novarupta

1912 in Alaska
1912 natural disasters
20th-century volcanic events
Aleutian Range
Katmai National Park and Preserve
Volcanoes of Lake and Peninsula Borough, Alaska
Mountains of Lake and Peninsula Borough, Alaska
Holocene lava domes
Mountains of Alaska
Natural disasters in Alaska
Subduction volcanoes
VEI-6 volcanoes
Calderas of Alaska
Volcanoes of Alaska
Holocene calderas